Castro Carazo (died 1981) was a Costa Rican-born American composer. He graduated from the Royal Conservatory of Music in Barcelona. Carazo collaborated on multiple songs with governor and senator Huey Long, including several of Louisiana State University's fight songs. He was also director of the LSU marching band.

References

External links
Castron Carazo on IMDb

Costa Rican composers
1981 deaths
Year of birth missing
Huey Long